Julia Boggs Grant (née Dent; January 26, 1826 – December 14, 1902) was the first lady of the United States and wife of President Ulysses S. Grant. As first lady, she became a national figure in her own right. Her memoirs, The Personal Memoirs of Julia Dent Grant were published in 1975.

Early life and education 
Julia Boggs Dent was born on January 26, 1826, at White Haven plantation west of St. Louis, Missouri.  Her parents were Frederick Dent (1787–1873), a slaveholding planter and merchant, and Ellen Wrenshall Dent.  Frederick owned about 30 African slaves, whom he freed only when compelled by law, having previously resisted moral arguments against slaveholding.

Julia, a distant maternal relative to Confederate general James Longstreet, was the fifth of eight children.  In her memoirs, Julia described her childhood as "one long summer of sunshine, flowers, and smiles…"

Around 1831–1836, Julia attended the Gravois School, a co-educational one-room schoolhouse in St. Louis.  From age 10 to age 17, Julia attended the Misses Mauros' boarding school in St. Louis with the daughters of other affluent parents.   Julia was a boarding student during the week and returned home to White Haven on weekends.

The Dent family was highly social with visitors coming from among the elite class of Cincinnati, Louisville and Pittsburgh.  William Clark (of Lewis and Clark) and politician Alexander McNair were family friends.

As a young woman, Julia was a skilled pianist, an expert horsewoman and a voracious reader of novels.

Strabismus 
Julia was born with strabismus (more commonly known as "crossed eyes") which prevents both eyes from lining up in the same direction. When she was younger, one of the best surgeons in the country offered to perform the simple operation that would fix them. Julia was not keen on surgery, however, and declined.

After her husband became president, Julia reconsidered surgery.  "I never had the courage to consent, but now that my husband had become so famous I really thought it behooved me to try to look as well as possible."  Ulysses objected: "Did I not see you and fall in love with you with these same eyes? I like them just as they are, and now, remember, you are not to interfere with them. They are mine and let me tell you, Mrs. Grant, you had better not make any experiments, as I might not like you half so well with any other eyes."

Because her strabismus was never corrected, Julia almost always posed in profile for portraits.

Engagement and marriage to Grant
While a student at West Point, New York, Fred Dent wrote his sister Julia about how impressed he was with a fellow student, Ulysses S. Grant. "I want you to know him, he is pure gold."  In 1844, Ulysses S. Grant began visiting the Dent family.  At one point her pet canary died, and Ulysses crafted a small yellow coffin and summoned eight fellow officers for an avian funeral service.  In April of that year, Ulysses asked Julia to wear his class ring, as a sign of their exclusive affection. Eighteen-year-old Julia initially demurred. Grant's regiment was then ordered to Louisiana, in preparation for service in the Mexican War. Distraught at their separation, Julia had an intense dream, which she detailed to several people, that Grant would somehow return within days, wearing civilian clothes and state his intention of staying for a week.  Despite the unlikeliness of the dream, Ulysses did return just as Julia had predicted and the two became engaged.

In July 1848, after they had been apart for four years, Grant's regiment returned to the United States, and he took leave so that he could make wedding arrangements in St. Louis.  Grant's father, Jesse Grant, refused to attend their wedding (August 22, 1848), objecting not to Julia, but to her family's owning slaves.

Early married life 

After the Grants were married, Ulysses returned to the Army. Julia gave birth to Frederick Dent Grant in 1850 and Ulysses Simpson Grant in 1852 while her husband was dispatched to the West Coast for several years. Unhappy to be so far from his family, Ulysses resigned from the Army in 1854 and the Grants moved to a small farm called "Hardscrabble" in St. Louis.

At one point, Ulysses purchased a slave from Julia's brother Fred, his old West Point roommate.  Yet without explanation, when he was in debt and barely able to put food on his family's table, Grant appeared in court on March 20, 1859, and emancipated his slave rather than selling him.

Ulysses became ill with malaria and was unable to run his farm.  The family moved in with Julia's parents in White Haven. Once he recovered, he took a job collecting rents for a real estate firm in St. Louis, but could not earn enough money. By 1860, Grant was out of options, and he asked his father for help. He was offered a job in the family leather business, working under his two younger brothers. Earning $600 a year, he could go a long way toward getting his family out of debt, so he moved Julia and the children to Illinois.

Civil War 
At the beginning of the Civil War, Ulysses helped organize volunteers and he soon took command of the Illinois troops.  He was promoted to brigadier general and then major general. Lonely without his wife, Ulysses sent for Julia.  She left the children with relatives and over the course of the Civil War she stayed with Ulysses during campaigns at Memphis, Vicksburg, Nashville and Virginia.  Julia covered more than 10,000 miles in four years—and nearly 4,000 in just the first year—to be with her husband. At one point, Julia lived at Walter Place, an Antebellum mansion in Holly Springs, Mississippi. When Confederate General Earl Van Dorn raided the house, he was not permitted by the pro-Union owner to enter before she went outside. Julia's presence lifted her husband's spirits and buoyed his confidence. In 1864, when Lincoln appointed Grant commander of the Union armies, the president sent for Julia to join her husband, aware of the positive effect she had on him.

Children 

The Grants had three sons and a daughter:
 Frederick Dent Grant (1850–1912)soldier, public official
 Ulysses Simpson Grant Jr. known as "Buck" (1852–1929)lawyer
 Ellen Wrenshall Grant known as "Nellie" (1855–1922)homemaker
 Jesse Root Grant (1858–1934)engineer

First Lady 
Julia was thrilled with her husband's nomination for the presidency in 1868—even more than the candidate himself—and immersed herself in his campaign. She was such a major figure in her husband's bid for the presidency that after his inauguration, Ulysses S. Grant turned to his wife and said, "And now, my dear, I hope you're satisfied."

After four years of war, an assassination, and an impeachment trial, Washington was ready for a little levity, and Julia obliged. She offered a full array of events and became a popular hostess. She planned lavish state dinners, where guests enjoyed expensive wines and liquors. She also received callers at informal receptions as long as the ladies wore hats and the men left their weapons at home.  Although Julia spent a great deal of money, she avoided the kind of spending criticism that had been directed at Mary Todd Lincoln.

Julia also sought to imbue the position of First Lady with the appropriate prestige. She believed that the position should command the same dignity and honors accorded wives of foreign leaders, and she was frustrated when the role was not publicly acknowledged. Not only did she seek added prestige for the first ladyship, but she also worked to improve the stature of the wives of the diplomatic corps, the cabinet, the Congress, and the Supreme Court.

As First Lady, Julia presided over Tuesday afternoon receptions for the general public.  As noted above, Julia's only requirements for these receptions were that ladies wore hats and the men left their weapons at home.

On May 21, 1874, First Daughter Nellie Grant married Algernon Charles Frederick Sartoris (1851–1893), a wealthy English singer, son of Adelaide Kemble and nephew of the famous actress Fanny Kemble.  It was the first grand White House wedding, and the East Room redecorated entirely for the occasion.  Andrew Jackson's three chandeliers were replaced by much grander "French" models, boasting thousands of glass pieces showered over a nickel-plated framework, with gas flames shaded by cut and frosted glass shades.

She was devastated to discover in 1875 that her husband had declined to run for a third term.

When the 1876 presidential election between Rutherford B. Hayes and Samuel Tilden ended in dispute, Julia saw an opportunity to extend her time in the White House. She thought her husband should remain President until the matter could be settled. She admitted that her "policy would have been to hold the fort until another election could be held." Her husband disagreed, and when Congress settled the election in favor of Hayes, Julia prepared to leave the White House.

Grant was the first First Lady recorded on film.

Views on women's rights 
She was a staunch defender of women's rights in general and refused to allow jokes at women's expense to be told in her company. Those who questioned the capabilities or equality of women earned her wrath, as Brigham Young discovered when the First Lady grilled him about the Church of Jesus Christ of Latter-day Saints' practice of polygamy and its negative effect on women. Yet while she believed in the abilities of women, she was not sure that women should work nor did she publicly support women's suffrage although she refused to sign an anti-suffrage petition—an obvious omission to many.

Views on slavery and race 
Julia grew up on a plantation with slaves and as a young woman had a slave known as "Jule" or "Black Julia".  It is not clear if Jule ever legally belonged to Julia.  Historians still debate whether Julia's father retained legal title to the four slaves his daughter claimed to own.  Julia's father insisted they leave the slaves with him when the Grants lived in the North, fearing they would escape to freedom.

Jule traveled with Julia Grant throughout the war.  In January 1862, Abraham Lincoln received an anonymous letter from Cairo, decrying Grant's drinking and his 'secesh' wife with her slave, but Lincoln took no action.  In her memoirs, Julia recalled "When I visited the General during the war, I nearly always had Jule with me as a nurse. She came near being captured at Holly Springs."

According to Julia, "Eliza, Dan, Jule, and John belonged to me up to the time of President Lincoln's Emancipation Proclamation", which exempted Missouri slaves from emancipation.  Even after that date, Jule continued her service to Julia.  In January 1864, Jule, Julia, and Julia's young son Jesse left Nashville for St. Louis.  On the trip, Jule left the group.  Julia later recalled. "I suppose she feared to lose her freedom if she returned to Missouri."  According to Julia, Jule married soon afterwards.

Julia seemed to believe that blacks were not fully equal to whites, but she refused to lend any support to white supremacists, including her brother Louis Dent. She strongly encouraged blacks on the White House domestic staff to buy land in the District while it was still cheap, in order to ensure their future financial security. She also decided to greet anyone properly dressed—regardless of race—who attended her afternoon receptions, but never questioned why blacks failed to call on her. The simple answer was that White House security prevented them from doing so.

Later life 
After accompanying her husband on a two-year world tour that took them to Europe, Africa, and Asia, Julia and Ulysses settled in New York City to enjoy their retirement from public life. However, all of their money was lost in an unwise investment scheme, and the Grants were reduced to poverty. Shortly afterward, Ulysses was diagnosed with the throat cancer that led to his death in 1885. In his dying days, Grant completed his Personal Memoirs, which left Julia and their children financially secure.

As a widow, Julia lived in Washington, D.C., where she wrote her own memoirs. Julia Grant was the first First Lady to write a memoir, though she was unable to find a publisher, and had been dead almost 75 years before The Personal Memoirs of Julia Dent Grant (Mrs. Ulysses S. Grant) was finally published in 1975. She had attended in 1897 the dedication of Grant's monumental tomb overlooking the Hudson River in New York City.  She was laid to rest in a sarcophagus beside her husband. She had ended her own chronicle of their years together with a firm declaration: "the light of his glorious fame still reaches out to me, falls upon me, and warms me."

While in Washington, D.C., Julia followed Dolley Madison's lead and acted as a "Queen Mother" figure.  She became friends with First Ladies Frances Cleveland, Caroline Harrison, and Edith Roosevelt.

She died on December 14, 1902, and is interred with her husband in General Grant's National Monument (Grant's Tomb) in New York City.

References

 White House biography
 White Haven – Ulysses S Grant National Historic Site

External links

 Julia Grant at C-SPAN's First Ladies: Influence & Image
 

1826 births
1902 deaths
19th-century American women
20th-century American women
19th-century Methodists
19th-century American women writers
20th-century Methodists
19th-century American memoirists
First ladies of the United States
Daughters of the American Revolution people
Grant family
People from St. Louis
Ulysses S. Grant
American women non-fiction writers
American women memoirists
American women slave owners